Sergiu Luca (4 April 1943, in Bucharest – 6 December 2010, in Houston) was a Romanian-born American violinist, renowned as an early music pioneer; during his career he performed and recorded on both baroque and modern violins.

Biography
Sergiu Luca was born in Bucharest, Romania, but his family moved to Israel at his age of 7, and as a 9 year old he debuted with the Haifa Symphony Orchestra. Before going to the United States to study at the Curtis Institute with Ivan Galamian, he studied in London and Switzerland.

His American debut was Sibelius's Violin Concerto with the Philadelphia Orchestra in 1965, on which occasion he was chosen by Leonard Bernstein to play its first movement with him conducting the New York Philharmonic later that year. During his career he recorded J. S. Bach's entire oeuvre for solo violin, the Brandenburg Concertos (with Pablo Casals), and a portion of the romantic and 20th-century repertoire.

In 1971 he launched the Chamber Music Northwest festival in Portland, Oregon, in 1983 he took the direction of Houston's Texas Chamber Orchestra which he held until 1986 when he founded the Cascade Head Music Festival on the Oregon Coast, in 1988 he founded Da Camera Society of Houston.  He was one of the founders of the Context chamber group. From 1983 until his death he was a professor at William Marsh Rice University.

He died of cholangiocarcinoma in Houston, Texas, at the age of 67. He survived by his wife, Susan Archibald and their daughter, Lily Luca (born in 2006).

External links
 
 
 Sergiu Luca's obituary in The New York Times
 
 Biographical notes at the Rice University homepage
 
 
 Interview with Sergiu Luca, June 28, 1988

1943 births
2010 deaths
Musicians from Houston
Musicians from Oregon
Romanian emigrants to Israel
Israeli violinists
American male violinists
Israeli emigrants to the United States
Jewish violinists
Rice University faculty
20th-century American violinists
20th-century American male musicians